The South American cougar (Puma concolor concolor), also known as the Andean mountain lion or puma, is a cougar subspecies occurring in northern and western South America, from Colombia and Venezuela to Peru, Bolivia, Argentina and Chile.

Taxonomy 
Felis concolor was proposed by Carl Linnaeus in 1771 for the cougar type specimen, which originated in French Guiana.
Since then, several cougar specimens from South America were described:
 Puma concolor puma proposed by Juan Ignacio Molina in 1782 was a specimen from Chile.
 Puma concolor cabrerae proposed by Reginald Innes Pocock in 1940 was a specimen collected in La Rioja Province, Argentina.
 Puma concolor capricornensis proposed by Edward Alphonso Goldman in 1946 was a specimen from Brazil.
As of 2017, these specimens are considered synonyms of P. c. concolor, the cougar subspecies occurring in South America.

Behavior and ecology 

The cougar preys on a variety of species based on its location, from birds, primates, vicuña, guanaco, deer, tapir, sloths, capybara, agouti, mara and other rodents, frogs, lizards, and the occasional domestic livestock, such as goats, poultry, cattle, llama and alpaca. In the west and northwestern regions of South America, cougar will sometimes prey on spectacled bear cubs.
In San Guillermo National Park, the vicuña is the cougar's main prey species, and constitutes about 80% of its diet. It also preys on guanaco, mice and hares, in the more southern extremes of its range. It abandons kills when harassed by Andean condors, which causes them to kill 50% more prey than North American cougars.

Cultural significance 
Like the jaguar, the cougar holds historical cultural significance amongst many South American indigenous people. People in the Andes regard the puma as being either a snatcher of souls, or as a helper of people. The cougar's name was used for Incan regions and people. The Chankas, who were enemies of the Incas, had the cougar as their deity.

References

External links 

Cougar
Fauna of northern South America
Mammals of Argentina
Mammals of Brazil
Mammals of Colombia
Mammals of Chile
Mammals of Bolivia
Mammals of Peru
Mammals of Guyana
Mammals of Venezuela
Pleistocene mammals of South America
Mammals described in 1771